Hemiboeckella is a genus of crustacean in family Centropagidae. It contains the following species:
Hemiboeckella andersonae Bayly, 1974
Hemiboeckella powellensis Bayly, 1979
Hemiboeckella searli G. O. Sars, 1912

References

Centropagidae
Taxonomy articles created by Polbot